Sis Lake is a small lake west of Eagle Bay in Herkimer County, New York. It drains east via an unnamed creek which flows into Bubb Lake.

See also
 List of lakes in New York

References 

Lakes of New York (state)
Lakes of Herkimer County, New York